Justin Bijlow (born 22 January 1998) is a Dutch professional footballer who plays as goalkeeper for Eredivisie club Feyenoord and the Netherlands national team.

International career
Bijlow was called up to the senior Netherlands squad in November 2020 but subsequently had to withdraw with an injury. He made his debut for the national team on 1 September 2021 in a 1–1 draw against Norway during the 2022 FIFA World Cup qualifiers. In November 2022, Louis van Gaal announced that Bijlow would be part of the squad at the 2022 FIFA World Cup.

Career statistics

Club

International

Honours
Feyenoord
Eredivisie: 2016–17
KNVB Cup: 2017–18
Johan Cruyff Shield: 2017, 2018
UEFA Europa Conference League runner-up: 2021–22

Individual
UEFA European Under-19 Championship Team of the Tournament: 2017
 Eredivisie Player of the Month: April 2021

References

External links

Profile at the Feyenoord website
Profile at the Royal Dutch Football Association website (in Dutch)

1998 births
Living people
Footballers from Rotterdam
Dutch footballers
Association football goalkeepers
Feyenoord players
Eredivisie players
Netherlands youth international footballers
Netherlands under-21 international footballers
Netherlands international footballers
2022 FIFA World Cup players